Heterodactylus imbricatus,  the Rio de Janeiro teiid, is a species of lizard in the family Gymnophthalmidae. It is endemic to Brazil.

References

Heterodactylus
Reptiles of Brazil
Endemic fauna of Brazil
Reptiles described in 1825
Taxa named by Johann Baptist von Spix